The 33rd European Men's Artistic Gymnastics Championships was held from 9 to 12 August 2018 at the SSE Hydro in Glasgow, Scotland, United Kingdom.

The competition was a portion of the first multi-sport European Championships.

Competition schedule

Medals summary

Medalists

Medal standings

Overall

Senior

Junior

Seniors' results

Team competition 
Oldest and youngest competitors

Floor 
Oldest and youngest competitors

Pommel horse 
Oldest and youngest competitors

Rings 
Oldest and youngest competitors

Vault 
Oldest and youngest competitors

Parallel bars 
Oldest and youngest competitors

Horizontal bar 
Oldest and youngest competitors

Juniors' results

Team competition

Individual all-around

Floor

Pommel horse

Rings

Vault

Parallel bars

Horizontal bar

Qualification results

Senior's results

Team competition

Floor

Pommel horse

Rings

Vault

Parallel bars

High bar

Junior's results

Floor

Pommel horse

Rings

Vault

Parallel bars

High bar

See also
 2018 European Women's Artistic Gymnastics Championships

References

External links 
 
 European Championships: Artistic Gymnastics 
 Results book − Artistic Gymnastics Men 
 33rd European Men’s Artistic Gymnastics Championships (GymnasticsResults.com)

European Artistic Gymnastics Championships
European Men's
European Artistic Gymnastics Championships (men)
Artistic
Gymnastics in Scotland
International sports competitions in Glasgow